Tesfa FC is an Eritrean football club based in Asmara.

The team was founded in 1994 and currently plays in Eritrean Premier League.

Stadium
Currently the team plays at the 20000 capacity ChicChero Stadium.
The team's current manager is Mekonnen Zewede.

Current squad
Senai Serimon			
Abraham Ambresajer			
Ambesajer Habtemariam				
Yohannes Nega				
Temesghen Asefaw				
Zerisenai Tsegay				
Dawit Ebraye				
Filmon Haile				
Mikele Girmay				
Omar Hassen			
Henok Neguse				
Biniam Fessahaye				
Anwar Mohamed			
Futsum Haileyesus				
Redwan Negash			
Naser Abdelwasae 				
Mikael Haile				
Futsum Tesfatsion				
Natnael Adisu				
Samsom Habtemariam				
Yonas Abraham				
Tekle Neguse				
Henok Neguse				
Zakriy Tesfai				
Yonas Nesfin			
Alexander Hadish				
Kibrom Andemaiam				
Daniel Gerezghier

References
Worldfootball

Football clubs in Eritrea
Organisations based in Asmara
1994 establishments in Eritrea